Toler Roberts Garvey (1865–1946) was an Irish tennis player who played Wimbledon in 1886, where he beat William Taylor before losing to Herbert Lawford in the semifinals. Garvey won several Irish tournaments including the King’s County and Ormonde Tournament three times (1886, 1894, 1896) (the 1890s was the most successful period in history for Irish tennis).  Garvey was a Justice of the Peace.

References

1865 births
1946 deaths
19th-century male tennis players
Irish male tennis players